Sarayu, or Sarju, is a river in Uttarakhand, India.

Sarayu may also refer to:

 INS Sarayu (P54), an Indian Navy ship
 Sarayu Mohan, Indian actress
 Sarayu Rao, American actress also known as Sarayu R. Blue
 Sarayu (Rigvedic river), a river mentioned in the Rigveda, various identified with Sarju or Hari rivers
 Sarayu River (Ayodhya), the Ghaghara river as it is known around the Ayodhya region in India